Tomas Maricic (born 16 April 1995 in Australia) is an Australian soccer player.

Career

At the age of 17, Maricic won Campbelltown City SC's Best and Fairest award, becoming the youngest to do so.

After playing for Australian lower league club Adelaide Olympic, he signed for Anagennisi Deryneia in the Cypriot top flight, making 1 league appearance before joining Cypriot lower league side PAEEK where he made 16 appearances.

In 2018, he returned to Australia with Adelaide City. From Adelaide City, Maricic signed for Lampang in the Thai second division.

References

External links
 

Australian soccer players
Living people
Association football defenders
Adelaide Olympic FC players
Adelaide City FC players
1995 births